Helena Sabina Erica Johansson (born 4 January 1973) is a Swedish wheelchair curler.

Career
Johansson participated at the 2021 World Wheelchair Curling Championship and 2022 Winter Paralympics.

Teams

Mixed doubles

References

External links 

 

1973 births
Living people
People from Hällefors Municipality
Swedish female curlers
Swedish wheelchair curlers
Paralympic wheelchair curlers of Sweden
Wheelchair curlers at the 2022 Winter Paralympics
Medalists at the 2022 Winter Paralympics
Paralympic medalists in wheelchair curling
Paralympic silver medalists for Sweden
21st-century Swedish women